The women's high jump event at the 2019 European Athletics Indoor Championships was held on 1 March at 19:00 (qualification) and 3 March at 19:15 (final) local time.

Medalists

Records

Results

Qualification

Qualification: Qualifying performance 1.96 (Q) or at least 8 best performers (q) advance to the Final

Final

References

2019 European Athletics Indoor Championships
High jump at the European Athletics Indoor Championships